Michael Joseph Stack III (born June 5, 1963) is an American attorney and former politician who served as the 33rd lieutenant governor of Pennsylvania from 2015 to 2019. A member of the Democratic Party, he previously served as a member of the Pennsylvania State Senate for the 5th district from 2001 to 2015.

Early life and education
Stack was born in Washington, D.C. He graduated from La Salle College High School, LaSalle University in 1987 and Villanova University School of Law in 1992.

Stack attended the Judge Advocate General's Legal Center and School at the University of Virginia and entered the United States Army Judge Advocate General's Corps.

Career

State senate career
Stack served in the Pennsylvania Senate from 2001 until 2015. In 2009, Stack was Democratic leader of Philadelphia's 58th ward.

Lieutenant governor term
He was the Democratic nominee for lieutenant governor of Pennsylvania in the 2014 election, running with Democratic gubernatorial nominee Tom Wolf. The Wolf/Stack ticket defeated the Republican Tom Corbett/Jim Cawley ticket in the 2014 gubernatorial election. Stack took the oath of office January 20, 2015. While serving as lieutenant governor, Stack had a high-profile falling out with governor Tom Wolf, owing in part to Stack's alleged mistreatment of staff and a difference in management styles with Wolf.

On May 15, 2018, Stack lost the state Democratic primary for lieutenant governor to Braddock Mayor John Fetterman, placing fourth overall. Stack is the only lieutenant governor of Pennsylvania to lose his renomination bid.

Stack ran briefly for a Philadelphia City Council at-large position, though withdrew in March 2019 after drawing a poor ballot position. His spokesman said Stack would continue to consider other opportunities for public service.

Subsequent career
Following his withdrawal from the city council race, Stack moved to California, where he was operating as of January 2020 as a comedian under the name "Mikey Stacks". Stack's routine involves self-deprecating jokes about his nickname "Mikey", as well as jokes around his mother's cooking, Donald Trump, Opioid use disorder and teenage suicide.

In August 2021, Stack appeared on the AWE show Find Me a Luxury Home, wherein he described himself as a lawyer seeking to purchase a $7 million home in Manhattan Beach, California. In October 2021, it was reported that Stack was contemplating a return to politics, considering a run in his old state senate district following incumbent senator John Sabatina's announcement that he would not seek re-election. In 2022, Stack said he might run for Mayor of Philadelphia as an independent in 2023. In January 2023, Stack announced he was running for Mayor. In February 2023, he dropped out of the race.

Personal life
Stack's grandfather, Michael J. Stack, was a U.S congressman from 1935 to 1939.

In 2002, he was named to the PoliticsPA list of best-dressed legislators.

Electoral history

References

External links
Stack for PA - official website
Project Vote Smart - Senator Michael J. 'Mike' Stack III (PA) profile
Follow the Money - Mike Stack
2006 2004 2002 2000 campaign contributions

|-

|-

1963 births
21st-century American comedians
21st-century American politicians
Candidates in the 2019 United States elections
Judge Advocates General of the United States Army
La Salle University alumni
Lieutenant Governors of Pennsylvania
Living people
Democratic Party members of the Pennsylvania House of Representatives
National Guard (United States) officers
Democratic Party Pennsylvania state senators
Politicians from Philadelphia
Villanova University School of Law alumni